Taylor Pass may be one of the following:

Mountain passes
Taylor Pass (Alberta) – a pass in Banff National Park, Alberta, Canada
Taylor Pass (British Columbia) – a pass in the Chilcotin Ranges of British Columbia, Canada
Taylor Pass (Arizona) – a pass in Graham County, Arizona, United States
Taylor Pass (Colorado) – a pass in the Elk Mountains of Colorado, United States

Waterways
Taylor Pass (Louisiana) – a river channel in Louisiana, United States